Today Wonder is the fourth solo album by Australian guitarist and songwriter Ed Kuepper. It was recorded in 1990 by Kuepper and drummer Mark Dawson and released on the Hot label. The album was re-released in 2002 with eight bonus tracks recorded for a Dutch radio station.

Details
Five years after the recording, Kuepper said, "I wanted to do something that had a much looser approach. Today Wonder was about as open as you can get. They were all demos. The album I did in a weekend with Dawson." Kuepper approached many record labels with none showing any interest. "We hawked them around everywhere Given that a couple of the songs on that album have broken me, it's pretty ironic. Record companies just couldn't hear anything."

Reception
The Allmusic review by Ned Raggett awarded the album 4 stars and states "Today Wonder in many ways was the release that helped determine part (if not all) of Ed Kuepper's future work. Specifically, it's the way around close, quiet, but still tense and strong performances... The end result's a beauty of a record".

Clinton Walker described the album as, "remarkable for the nature of the songs themselves, as Kuepper plumbed a personal honesty that most singer/songwriters wouldn't dare confront. Today Wonder, in finding new dimensions and textures again, was nothing short or revelatory."

Track listing
All compositions by Ed Kuepper except as indicated
 "Horse Under Water" - 6:04
 "Always the Woman Pays" - 3:13
 "Everything I've Got Belongs to You" - 4:33
 "What You Don't Know" - 4:01
 "I'd Rather Be the Devil" (Skip James) - 4:24
 "There's Nothing Natural" - 3:45
 "Today Wonder Medley: Today Wonder/Hey Gyp/White Houses" (Kuepper, Donovan Leitch, Eric Burdon) - 4:32
 "Pretty Mary" - 3:41
 "Eternally Yours" - 5:33
 "If I Were a Carpenter" (Tim Hardin) - 3:57
 "Intermission" - 0:18
 "Always the Woman Pays" [Live] - 4:02 Bonus track on CD reissue
 "What You Don't Know" [Live] - 4:32 Bonus track on CD reissue
 "Pretty Mary" [Live] - 4:18 Bonus track on CD reissue
 "Today Wonder Medley" [Live] (Kuepper, Leitch, Burdon) - 4:14  Bonus track on CD reissue
 "Horse Under Water" [Live] - 5:30  Bonus track on CD reissue
 "I Am Your Prince/Told Myself" [Live] - 7:15  Bonus track on CD reissue
 "Everything I've Got Belongs to You" [Live] - 4:32 Bonus track on CD reissue
Recorded at Electric Avenue Studio, Rozelle, Sydney, Australia (tracks 1-10) and the Netherlands (tracks 11-18).

Personnel
Ed Kuepper - vocals, 12 string guitar, elastic guitar
Mark Dawson - drums, cardboard box

References

Hot Records albums
Ed Kuepper albums
1990 albums